Jérémie K. Dagnini is a French academic, specializing in Jamaican popular music.

Biography 
Jérémie Kroubo Dagnini is a French scholar, he holds a PhD in Anglophone studies from the University Bordeaux Montaigne. He is a Jamaican popular music specialist and an associate researcher at the Center for Contemporary Political Studies at the University of Orléans (CEPOC). He is the author of numerous books and articles and has also translated the biography of Lee Scratch Perry written by journalist David Katz. In 2013, he co-wrote a book with American artist Lee Jaffe, Bob Marley & The Wailers: 1973-1976, revealing, among other things, precious details about the daily life of the band in Hope Road and Trench Town at that time, the links Bob Marley had with the local Mafia, and the 1976 smuggling operation that raised money to fund Peter Tosh groundbreaking album Legalize It.  JKD also co-wrote a documentary on reggae, "Le Souffle du reggae", directed by Jérémie Cuvillier and broadcast in 2016 on France Ô. In March 2017 he was awarded by the Académie Charles Cros for his book Musiques noires. L'Histoire d'une résistance sonore. He regularly gives national and international conferences on reggae and jamaican music. In November 2018, Unesco has declared reggae as an 'intangible heritage site', J. Kroubo Dagnini delivered his insights on the topic. More recently, he gave his views on the popular Jamaican expression Bumbo Klaat in the French broadsheet Le Monde. JKD is of Ivorian descent through his father side.

Books 
 Les Origines du reggae : Retour aux sources. Mento, ska, rocksteady, early reggae, L'Harmattan, 2008 . Reissued by Éditions du Camion Blanc in 2013 (preface by professor Barry Chevannes). 
 Vibrations jamaïcaines. L'Histoire des musiques populaires jamaïcaines au XXe siècle, Camion blanc, 2011 .
 Lee "Scratch" Perry: People Funny Boy (translation). Author: David Katz, Camion blanc, 2012 . 
 Bob Marley & The Wailers: 1973-1976. Co-author: Lee Jaffe. Camion Blanc, 2013 . 
 Rasta & Résistance (directeur d'ouvrage et préface). Author : Horace Campbell. Camion blanc, 2014 .
 DJs & toasters jamaïcains : 1970-1979. Co-author: Eric Doumerc. Camion Blanc, 2015 . 
 Musiques noires. L'Histoire d'une résistance sonore (Editor). Camion blanc, 2016 .
 La Peur: crise du siècle?" (Editor). Camion noir, 2022
.

 Documentaries 
 Le Souffle du reggae (English title: Blowin' In The Reggae Wind), documentary directed by Jérémie Cuvillier and co-written with Jérémie Kroubo Dagnini. 52 mins (Theorem/ France Ô). Selected at the Francophone Film Festival in Kingston, Jamaica (14-24 November 2018). And film screening at the National Gallery of Jamaica on 28 April 2019 (The 25th Art of Reggae Exhibition).

 External links 
 Website of Jérémie Kroubo Dagnini.
 Academic personal page
 Interview in The Inrocks en 2009: conversation with Francis Dordor.
 Conversation with professor Carolyn Cooper on Jamaican music (October 2010)
 Interview on Reggae.fr. (February 2012)
 Les bonnes feuilles de Lee "Scratch" Perry: People Funny Boy (2012)
 Les bonnes feuilles de Bob Marley & The Wailers: 1973-1976 (2013)
 Review of Bob Marley & The Wailers: 1973-1976 in Inrocks and in Jamaica Observer
 Review of Musiques noires in Le Monde diplomatique and interview in CQFD. 
 The Importance of Reggae Music in the Worldwide Cultural Universe article (in English) by J. Kroubo Dagnini published in the academic journal Études caribéennes (August 2010).
 Kingston: A Societal Patchwork article (in English) by J. Kroubo Dagnini published in the academic journal Études caribéennes'' (June 2018).

References 

French scholars
21st-century French musicologists
Living people
Year of birth missing (living people)
Jamaican music